Vespinitocris ichneumon is a species of beetle in the family Cerambycidae. It was described by Hintz in 1919. It is known from the Democratic Republic of the Congo.

Varietas
 Vespinitocris ichneumon var. vespiformis Breuning, 1950
 Vespinitocris ichneumon var. rufoantennalis Breuning, 1950

References

Saperdini
Beetles described in 1919
Endemic fauna of the Democratic Republic of the Congo